Utopia is In Strict Confidence's eighth studio album.

Track listing

Singles and EPs
 Morpheus
 Tiefer
 Justice

References

2012 albums
In Strict Confidence albums